United States Numbered Highways in the U.S. state of Connecticut, are numbered by the American Association of State Highway and Transportation Officials (AASHTO) and maintained by the Connecticut Department of Transportation, a total of  as a system of state highways and are numbered from 1 to 202.

History
In 1926, the U.S. highway system was implemented. U.S. Routes 1, 5, 6, and 7, plus 202 were used as designations on several primary state highways, replacing New England routes 1, 2, 3, and 4, respectively. The other New England routes that were not re-designated as U.S. routes became ordinary state highways but kept their number designation, which are used even today (with some realignment).

Primary routes

Alternate and auxiliary routes

See also
List of State Routes in Connecticut

References

External links

 
United States